Thalassa is a French documentary television series, broadcast for many years on Friday at 8:50 pm on France 3 and presented by Georges Pernoud.

In 2017, Pernoud announced his departure from Thalassa. From 2 October 2017, Fanny Agostini presented the show, once a month on a Monday at 8:55 pm, alternating with other discovery programs, including Faut pas rêver, another show created by Pernoud.

Thalassa is produced by France Télévisions. The show is also broadcast on TV5 Monde and is subtitled in six languages, including English.

It is entirely focused on the sea (θάλασσα, thálassa in Ancient and Modern Greek) – geography, ecology, fishing, transportation, and yachting.

It is one of the oldest French TV series still running (together with Des chiffres et des lettres). It started on 27 September 1975 and is still one of the most prominent TV programs in France.

See also
 Thalassa (mythology), Greek sea goddess which means "sea"

References

External links
 Thalassa on IMDb

1975 French television series debuts
French documentary television series
Nautical television series
1970s French television series
1980s French television series
1990s French television series
2000s French television series
2010s French television series
2020s French television series